Pristaulacus occidentalis is a species of wasp in the family Aulacidae. It is found in North America.

Subspecies
These two subspecies belong to the species Pristaulacus occidentalis:
 Pristaulacus occidentalis lavatus (Townes, 1950)
 Pristaulacus occidentalis occidentalis (Cresson, 1879)

References

Further reading

 

Parasitic wasps
Articles created by Qbugbot
Insects described in 1879
Evanioidea